Huron is an unincorporated community in Polk County, in the U.S. state of Missouri.

History
A post office called Huron was established in 1897, and remained in operation until 1918. The community was named after Huron, Tennessee, the native home of a share of the early settlers.

References

Unincorporated communities in Polk County, Missouri
Unincorporated communities in Missouri